Blair is a literary small press publisher based in Durham, North Carolina, founded in 1976 as Carolina Wren Press by Judy Hogan. The press mainly publishes poetry (both full collections, and limited-edition chapbooks), but also publishes fiction and nonfiction, biography, autobiography, literary nonfiction by and/or about people of color, women, gay/lesbian issues, health and mental health topics in children's literature.

Each year, Blair honors one writer with the Doris Bakwin Award. As a literary small-press publisher, many members of the Board of Directors, as well as many previous judges for various contests, are volunteers from across the country.

Mission 
As a small press, the publisher is different from many mainstream publishers for several reasons. First, it is nonprofit organization whose mission is to publish quality writing by writers historically neglected by mainstream publishing. And second, it seeks to develop diverse and vital audiences not simply through publishing, but also through outreach and educational programs.

History 
From Judy Hogan's personal essay:

In 2018, Carolina Wren acquired John F. Blair, Publisher, and took the name Blair. John F. Blair, Publisher was founded in 1954.

Contests and awards 
In odd-numbered years, with a postmark deadline of February 15, the publisher reads full-length poetry collections by emerging authors who haven't had more than one full-length book published.

In even-numbered years, with a postmark deadline of February 15, the publisher reads submissions to the Doris Bakwin Award for Writing by a Woman.

List of contest winners 
Doris Bakwin Award
 2006: Jeanne M. Leiby, Downriver. Selected by Quinn Dalton.
 2008: Phoebe Hoss, All Eyes: A Mother's Struggle to Save Her Schizophrenic Son. Selected by Jeanne Leiby.
 2010: Margaret Hermes, Relative Strangers. Selected by Jill McCorkle.

Poetry Series
 Sandy Becker, Foreign Bodies. Selected by Joseph Donohue. 
 Linda Pennisi, Suddenly, Fruit. Selected by William Pitt Root.
 Tiffany Higgins, and Aeneas stares into her helmet. Selected by Evie Shockley.
 Yvonne Murphy, Aviaries. Selected by Minnie Bruce Pratt.

References 

1976 establishments in North Carolina
Book publishing companies based in North Carolina
Companies based in Durham, North Carolina
Publishing companies established in 1976